Henry Bowditch may refer to:

Henry Ingersoll Bowditch (1808–1892), American abolitionist
Henry Pickering Bowditch (1840–1911), American physiologist